The Mother Goose Stakes is an American thoroughbred horse race for three-year-old fillies held at Belmont Park in Elmont, New York. Raced on dirt in late June or early July, the race currently offers a purse of $300,000. Inaugurated in 1957 at a mile and a sixteenth, it was lengthened to a mile and an eighth in 1959. Originally part of the Triple Tiara of Thoroughbred Racing, the Mother Goose was removed from the series in 2010 and its distance reverted to a mile and a sixteenth.

The Mother Goose was run as a Grade II event beginning in 2017. It had been a Grade I event since 1974 (when grading was first introduced).

The race was named for H.P. Whitney's filly Mother Goose, one of only thirteen fillies to have ever won the male dominated Belmont Futurity Stakes.

The Mother Goose Stakes was run at Aqueduct Racetrack from 1963 to 1967, in 1969, and again in 1975.

Records 

Speed Record: 
  miles – 1:46.33 – Rachel Alexandra (2009)
  miles – 1:41.01 – Off The Tracks (2016)

Largest Winning Margin: 
  lengths – Rachel Alexandra (2009)

Most wins by an owner:
3 – Eugene V. Klein (1984, 1987, 1989)

Most wins by a jockey:
6 – John Velazquez (1996, 2001, 2007, 2010, 2011, 2014)

Most wins by a Trainer:
6 – Todd A. Pletcher (1998, 2007, 2010, 2011, 2016, 2021)
6 – D. Wayne Lukas (1984, 1986, 1987, 1989, 1995, 2004)

Winners

References 

Graded stakes races in the United States
Flat horse races for three-year-old fillies
Grade 1 stakes races in the United States
Horse races in New York (state)
Belmont Park
Grade 2 stakes races in the United States
Recurring sporting events established in 1957
1957 establishments in New York (state)